Oliveria Louisa Prescott (3 September 1842 – 9 September 1919) was an English writer and composer.

Biography
Oliveria Prescott was born in London, the daughter of Frederick Joseph Prescott and Elizabeth Oliveria Russell. 
She studied with Lindsay Sloper and then at the Royal Academy of Music under George Alexander Macfarren. She became Macfarren's amenuensis.

She lectured in harmony and composition for Newnham College, Cambridge, and also taught harmony at the High School for Girls in Baker Street, London. She died in London.

Works
Prescott composed several overtures, a piano concerto, shorter orchestral pieces, vocal and choral works and two symphonies.

Selected works include:

Stage
Carrigraphuga, The Castle of the Fairies, musical comedy in three acts (1914), words by S. Phillips

Keyboard
Concert Finale, pianoforte duet (1878)

Choral
"A Border Ballad", four-part song (1844), words by Francis William Bourdillon 
Lord Ullin's Daughter, choral ballad (1869), after Lord Ullin's Daughter by Thomas Campbell
"Song of Waterspirits" four-part song (1874), words by E. Evans
The Righteous Life for Evermore, anthem for four voices (1876)
"The Ballad of Young John and his True Sweetheart", part song (1878)
"The Douglas Raid", four-part song (1883), words by J. Stewart
"The Huntsman", four-part song (1883), words by J. Stewart
"Equestrian Courtship", part song (1885), words by T. Hood
"Say Not, the Struggle Nought Availeth", part song (1885), words by A. H. Clough

Song
"There Is for Every Day a Bliss" (1873), words by J. W. H.
"Ask Me No More", with violincello obbligato (1874), after The Princess by Alfred, Lord Tennyson
"Cheero!", marching song for whistlers and singing (1915), words by S. Phillips

References

Sophie Fuller, "Women musicians and professionalism in the late-nineteenth and early-twentieth centuries." In The Music Profession in Britain, 1780–1920, ed. Rosemary Golding (London and New York: Routledge, 2018), 149–69.

1842 births
1917 deaths
19th-century classical composers
20th-century classical composers
British music educators
Women classical composers
English classical composers
Alumni of the Royal Academy of Music
Musicians from London
20th-century English composers
19th-century English musicians
20th-century English women musicians
19th-century British composers
Women music educators
20th-century women composers
19th-century women composers